"Sticky" is a song by the American rock group, the Maine. It is their first and lead single off their eighth studio album XOXO: From Love and Anxiety in Real Time released on March 19, 2021. As of 2022, it is their highest-charting single. The song peaked at number 16 on the Billboard Alternative Airplay chart and at number 32 on the Rock Airplay chart.

Background
In an interview with Billboard magazine, lead singer John O'Callaghan revealed he began working on the song in January 2020. The song was co-written by Andrew Goldstein. The track runs at 105 BPM and is in the key of C major.

On June 4, 2021, they released a piano version of the song with the indie pop trio Shaed. On July 23, 2021, a remix to the song was released digitally.

Music video
The music video premiered on March 19, 2021. It was directed by Angela Kohler. The music video shows colorful visual with each band member trying to get themselves out of peculiar situations with commonly sticky objects such as honey, glue, lollipops, rubber bands and tape. The visual soon comes to a close as the band look on while covered in hundreds of little white feathers.

Track listing
Digital download

Piano version

The Knocks remix

Personnel
Credits for "Sticky" adapted from AllMusic.

Musicians

The Maine
John O'Callaghan – lead vocals
Jared Monaco – guitar
Kennedy Brock – guitar
Pat Kirch – drums
Garrett Nickelsen – bass guitar 

Production

Andrew Goldstein – producer
John O'Callaghan – producer
Neal Avron – mixing

Charts

Release history

References

2021 singles
2021 songs
Songs written by Andrew Goldstein (musician)
The Maine (band) songs